Banks Springs is an unincorporated community and census-designated place (CDP) in Caldwell Parish, Louisiana, United States. As of the 2020 census it had a population of 1136. The CDP includes the neighborhood of Columbia Heights.

U.S. Route 165 passes through the center of Banks Springs, leading north  to Monroe and southwest  to Alexandria.

Demographics

References

Census-designated places in Louisiana
Census-designated places in Caldwell Parish, Louisiana